The Kelantan Islamic Museum is a museum about Islam in Kota Bharu, Kelantan, Malaysia.

History

The museum building used to be the official residence of Kelantan Chief Minister Hassan Mohd Salleh. The building also used to house the Kelantan Islamic Council and Malay Costumes from 1917 to 1990. The building was then renovated and turned into museum which was opened on 11 November 1991 by Kelantan Sultan Ismail Petra.

Architecture
The 2-story museum building was built by wood and embedded with Islamic calligraphy of verses from the Quran. It has two stories where the lower floor houses the museum and the upper floor houses a library. The museum building resembles a mosque.

Exhibitions
The museum exhibits the root of Islam in Kelantan from various artifacts and inscription documents it displays.

See also
 List of museums in Malaysia

References

Kota Bharu
Museums in Kelantan
1991 establishments in Malaysia
Museums established in 1991
Islamic museums in Malaysia